Robert Pearson Carpenter (18 November 1830 – 14 July 1901) was an English first-class cricketer who played between 1855 and 1876, generally acknowledged to be one of the outstanding batsmen of the 1850s and 1860s. He was a right-handed batsman, usually opening the innings, and an occasional wicketkeeper. He played mostly for the Cambridge and Cambridgeshire sides, the North and the United All-England Eleven. In 1859, Carpenter went to North America as a member of the first-ever overseas tour undertaken by the England team and, in 1862–63, was in the England team to Australia and New Zealand. When travelling to Australia, the team travelled from Liverpool to Melbourne on the SS Great Britain. 
He umpired in two Test matches between England and Australia in the 1880s. His son Herbert played for Essex.

Carpenter's known first-class career spanned the 1855 to 1876 seasons.  He scored 5,220 runs in 141 matches with an average of 24.39, making four centuries with a highest score of 134. A noted fielder, he held 190 catches and made two stumpings.

At the end of the 1859 English cricket season, Carpenter was one of the twelve players who took part in cricket's first-ever overseas tour when an England cricket team led by George Parr visited North America. He also toured Australia with Parr in 1863. In the early 1860s, Carpenter and his Cambridgeshire contemporary Thomas Hayward were rated the finest batsmen in England. Richard Daft was among those ranking them as equal first, but George Parr reckoned Carpenter the better of the two. W. G. Grace said of Carpenter that "he may be safely placed as one of the finest of our great batsmen".

Carpenter played in the Gentlemen v Players fixture for the Players on many occasions, scoring centuries in the 1860 and 1861 fixtures at The Oval. In the 1860 match, he hit a ball clean out of The Oval.

References

External links 

 

1830 births
1901 deaths
Cricketers from Cambridgeshire
Cambridge Town Club cricketers
English Test cricket umpires
English cricketers of 1826 to 1863
English cricketers of 1864 to 1889
English cricketers
Left-Handed v Right-Handed cricketers
Married v Single cricketers
North v South cricketers
Players cricketers
Sportspeople from Cambridge
United All-England Eleven cricketers
United North of England Eleven cricketers
Players of the North cricketers
Cambridgeshire and Yorkshire cricketers
All-England Eleven cricketers